The Great Peace March for Global Nuclear Disarmament, Inc. (also referred to as The Great Peace March, GPM, and the March) was a cross-country event in 1986 aimed at raising awareness to the growing danger of nuclear proliferation and to advocate for complete, verifiable elimination of nuclear weapons from the earth. The GPM consisted of hundreds of people, mostly but not exclusively Americans, who convened in Los Angeles, California, United States, in February 1986 to walk from L.A. to Washington, D.C., the nation's capital. The group left Los Angeles on March 1, 1986 and arrived in Washington, D.C. on November 15, 1986, a journey of about 3,700 miles, nine months, and many campsites.

Organization 
The March was conceived by Los Angeles businessman David Mixner, who formed People Reaching Out for Peace (PRO-Peace), a non-profit organization. Due to bankruptcy, PRO-Peace folded while the March was in Barstow, California. A few weeks of round-the-clock meetings followed to assess resources, reorganize, and to form a grassroots, self-governed organization. Once reorganized, the March continued its eastward trek. Participants in the march included bookseller John Windle and Lily S. Cree, environmental activist.

Peace marches before and after 

 In 1976 the War Resisters League took part in organizing "The Continental Walk for Nuclear Disarmament and Social Justice" which also left from Los Angeles and arrived in Washington, simultaneously with several "branch" routes.
 "Pleading for Peace, Archaeologists Studying Camp Where Anti-nuclear Activists Staged Protests." Article about the Nevada Test Site.
 "Analysis of Mother's Day Action 1987" (Once there, click on magnifier image to bring up text. Scroll up a bit to get to the beginning of the subject.)
 "American Soviet Walk: Taking Steps to End the Nuclear Arms Race," by Fred Segal and Fred E. Basten.
 "OurMove.org" offers a detailed, annotated photographic account of the American Soviet Peace Walk, which took place on the 450 kilometer stretch between St. Petersburg (then Leningrad) and Moscow, Russia, in the summer of 1987. Ourmove.org is based on a 1988 book by Fred Segal & Fred E. Basten, "American Soviet Walk: Taking Steps to End the Nuclear Arms Race," published by the United World of the Universe Foundation.
 Article with quite a bit about the Soviet-American walk, "Saying No To Power Autobiography of a 20th Century Activist and Thinker," by William Mandel.
 At least one part-time participant of the Great Peace March, Kevin James Shay, participated in a previous two-year march called Walk of the People – A Pilgrimage for Life that went across the U.S. and Europe in 1984–85. Shay walked with the Great Peace March for its first week in California.

Outcomes and resources

Film 
 Just One Step was a documentary film of the Great Peace March by Cathy Zheutlin, edited by James Knight

Books 

 Spirit Walk: The Great Peace March of 1986 By Martin Vincent Hippie. 2012. 434 pages.
 Walking For Our Lives by marcher Donna Rankin Love
 The Great Peace March: An American Odyssey (Peacewatch Edition) by Franklin Folsom, Connie Fledderjohann, Gerda Lawrence
 Feet Across America by New Zealand marcher Anne Macfarlane
 Peace Like a River: A Personal Journey Across America by Sue Guist
 Lost Journals from the Great Peace March by Gene Gordon
 A Strange Place Called Home: My Walk Across America on the Great Peace March by Laura Monagan
 The Great Peace March, song into children's book by Holly Near, Paintings by Lisa Desimini
 Central Body: The Art of Guy Colwell, including work from the years 1964 to 1991. Includes a section of his sketches of the G.P.M.
 "Pit Stop For The Angels" by Bill Patterson This book contains sketches of the marchers and the places they stayed throughout the march.
 Walking to Japan — a Memoir by Derek Youngs & Carolyn Affleck Youngs. 2016. This book contains several chapters about the Great Peace March. 
 The Prince of Peace City, a novel based on the Great Peace March by marcher Lee W. Anderson. 2016.

Research 
 Peace March: Process = Success, Conflict Resolution Consortium, Working Paper 90-3, May, 1990. By Lynne Ihlstrom, Department of Sociology, University of Colorado at Boulder.

Music 
 Wild Wimmin For Peace CD
 Lyrics for song from Wild Wimmin CD-Bridgett Evans by Judy Small
 "No More Silence" YouTube video. Song written by marcher Darryl Purpose. This updated version sung by Clan Dyken with new rap added.
 No More Silence lyrics.
 Beautiful Planet by Michael Krieger. Scroll down to "Look Inside" CD.

Articles written by marchers 

 "A Laboratory in Democracy: Revisiting the Great Peace March" by Steve Brigham
 "How to Make a Decision Without Making a Decision" (written for Communities magazine, Winter 2000) by Tom Atlee
 "The Tao of Democracy" by Tom Atlee

Audio interviews 

 "The Wisdom of the Whole", audio of Tom Atlee
 "Audio interview with New Zealand marcher Maynie Thompson"

Other marches 

The New England Walk for Nuclear Disarmament occurred in 1987 covering over 200 miles from Portland, NH to Groton, CT. The walk was organized by Seeds of Peace, a group of organizers from the GPM, and used equipment from the GPM.

The Great March for Climate Action in 2014 was inspired in part by its founder Ed Fallon's experience with the 1986 Great Peace March.

References

External links

Related archives 
 Swarthmore College 
 The Great Peace March Audio Video Archive 
 Archives from Pro Peace 
 California Online Archives 
 Pro-peace/Mixner archives 
 Yale University Archives, David Mixner's papers 
 Franklin Folsom's personal papers archived at University of Colorado at Boulder 
 Harvard Archive of the International Peace Walk | Folsom, Affeldt, Smith et al. Scroll down to the word "International" 
 Archive Grid | Various items related to the GPM. 

1986 protests
Anti–nuclear weapons movement
Anti-war protests in the United States
1986 in the United States
Peace marches
Protest marches in Washington, D.C.
Anti-nuclear protests in the United States
Environmental protests in the United States